Two Still Lives in Free Fall is a composition (two pieces) for flute and cello by Juan Maria Solare (Composed in Cologne, Germany, from 8 to 18 June 1998). Duration: 5:30. The piece is dedicated to Tasneem Hanfi and Caroline Stinson.

The piece makes use of extended techniques (for the flute), concretely frullato (flutter tongue), tongued pizzicato and "Pauken-Effekt" (tongue ram). The cello, besides the usual techniques (ranging from sul tasto to sul ponticello, flautato and col legno), uses "tap": "martellato mano sinistra" (martellato left hand: tapping the strings with the fingertips of the left hand.

Compositions by Juan María Solare